PrepStar College Recruiting, known also as PrepStar, is an online magazine at www.prepstar.com, which was established in 1982. It provides information on the top football and basketball prospects in the United States.  The online magazine is produced by College Sports USA, which was founded by Jeff Duva, a former college quarterback, and Jack Wright.

In 1999, Duva was its publisher, and Rick Kimbrel was its editor.  It is located in Woodland Hills, California.

References

External links
Prepstar homepage

1982 establishments in California
Sports magazines published in the United States
Magazines established in 1982
Magazines published in California
Online magazines published in the United States